Liga Deportiva Universitaria de Quito's 2012 season will be the club's 82nd year of existence, the 59th year in professional football, and the 51st in the top level of professional football in Ecuador.

Club

Personnel
President: Carlos Arroyo
Honorary President: Rodrigo Paz
President of the Executive Commission: Esteban Paz
President of the Football Commission: Edwin Ripalda
Vice-President of the Football Commission: Patricio Torres
Sporting manager: Santiago Jácome

Coaching staff
Manager: Edgardo Bauza
Assistant manager: José Daniel Di Leo
Physical trainer: Bruno Militano
Goalkeeper trainer: Gustavo Flores
Statistician: Maximiliano Bauza

Kits
Supplier: Umbro
Sponsor(s): Diners Club International, Chevrolet, Coca-Cola, Discover

Squad information
Liga's squad for the season is allowed a maximum of four foreign players at any one time, and a maximum of eight throughout the season. At the start of the season, Liga was mandated to start one under-19 player in each match. The jersey numbers in the main table (directly below) refer to the number on their domestic league jersey. The under-19 players will wear a jersey number of at least #50. For each CONMEBOL competition, Liga must register 25 players, whose jerseys will be numbered 1–25. Because of this, some players may have different jersey numbers while playing in CONMEBOL matches.

Note: Caps and goals are of the national league and are current as of the beginning of the season.

Winter transfers
In a press conference on December 20, 2011, Liga de Quito announced the signings of veteran midfielder Édison Méndez of Emelec and season-long loan of Elvis Bone from Olmedo. In the same press conference, Liga announced that Argentine midfielders Ezequiel González and Lucas Acosta would not continue with the team, and that Argenis Moreira was signed by Ambato-based club Técnico Universitario. The next day it was announced that Técnico also signed midfielder William Araujo on a one-year contract. On January 4, 2011, Liga de Quito announced in a press conference the signing of Ecuadorian midfielder David Quiroz (season-long loan from Atlante). The next day, January 5, 2011, Argentinean defender Ezequiel Luna confirmed that he will be playing for Liga during the 2012 season.

Summer transfers
On June 1, 2012, the club announced that Luis Bolaños was loaned to Club Atlas.  On June 25, the club hired Eduardo Echeverría to be the new foreign player of the team. Forward Joao Plata returned to the club after a year-and-a-half on a loan from Toronto FC.

Competitions

Pre-season friendlies

Serie A

The 2012 season is Liga's 51st season in the Serie A and their eleventh consecutive. The league season will run from early February to early December. The format is identical to the previous season.

First stage
The First Stage of the season ran from February 5 to July 7. Liga finished 6th and failed to qualify to the Finals, 2012 Copa Sudamericana, 2013 Copa Libertadores and 2013 Copa Sudamericana during this stage.

Second stage

The Second Stage of the season ran from July 14 to December 2. Liga finished 3rd and qualified to 2013 Copa Libertadores during this stage.

Third stage

Player statistics

Last updated: December 16, 2012.Note 1: Players in italics left the club mid-season.* Knee injury ended Vera’s season.Source:

References

External links
Official Site 
LDU Quito (5) - Olmedo (0)

2012
Ecuadorian football clubs 2012 season